Marvin Herman Scilken (December 7, 1926 – February 2, 1999) was an American librarian and a leader in the field of library science during the 20th century. Scilken dedicated his life to bringing awareness to libraries and improving services for patrons. He encouraged libraries to take a more practical approach to librarianship and to consider libraries as a house of books rather than information centers.   In 1999, American Libraries named him one of the "100 Most Important Leaders We Had in the 20th Century".

Early life and career
Marvin Scilken was born and raised in the Bronx, New York.  His parents were Russian immigrants Joseph Scilken and Esther Scilken and he had one sister Marjorie. Scilken attended his local high school, Bronx High School of Science, and then continued his education at the University of Colorado-Boulder where he earned bachelor's degrees in Economics and Philosophy.

When he graduated in 1948, he had not yet considered pursuing a career in library science. It was not until 1960 that library science piqued his interest. Scilken was originally interested in pursuing his Masters in Library Science degree at Columbia University. However, upon applying to Columbia's program, he was asked for an essay on why he was interested in becoming a librarian and, as Scilken said, “I dawdled so much that time ran out and I failed to get in”

On Library Science and Technology
One of Scilken's great concerns was that libraries are forgetting their roots and their identities. It worried him that librarians are changing their identity in order to seem current with technology. He had become concerned that libraries and librarians are too quickly adopting any new fad or technology.  Overall, he was disappointed that libraries are now considering themselves information centers. He encouraged libraries to return to their focus on books and often “[told his] colleagues that [libraries] are in the book business, not the information business.”

References

Works Consulted
Roy, L, & Cherian, A. (Eds.). (2002). Getting Libraries the Credit They Deserve: A Festschrift in Honor of Marvin H. Scilken. Oxford: Scarecrow Press.

External links
 the U*N*A*B*A*S*H*E*D Librarian site

1926 births
1999 deaths
American librarians
People from the Bronx
The Bronx High School of Science
University of Colorado Boulder alumni
Pratt Institute alumni
American librarianship and human rights